The Veracruz Mexico Temple, located in Boca del Río in the Mexican state of Veracruz, is the 93rd operating temple of the Church of Jesus Christ of Latter-day Saints (LDS Church).

History
The LDS Church announced on April 14, 1999 that a temple would be built near the Mexican port city of Veracruz, Veracruz. The Veracruz temple, located in the adjacent city of Boca del Río some 10 km south of downtown Veracruz, is one of twelve LDS temples in Mexico. Previously, local members had to travel to the Mesa Arizona Temple in the United States.

The first Mormon missionaries arrived in Veracruz in 1955. The first meetinghouse was built in 1961. At the dedication of the meetinghouse nearly 700 people were in attendance even though the meetinghouse would serve not quite 400. After the dedication of the meetinghouse the missionary work in the area grew rapidly. 

A groundbreaking ceremony and site dedication for the Veracruz México Temple were held on May 29, 1999, with Carl B. Pratt, of the Seventy, presiding. Around 600 people attended the ceremony. The temple was open for tours to the public from June 26 through July 1, 2000. More than 10,000 people toured the temple during this time.

Thomas S. Monson, of the church's First Presidency, dedicated the Veracruz temple on July 9, 2000. Four sessions were held and more than 5,000 members attended. The temple serves nine stakes, two districts, and two branches in the area. 

In 2020, like all the church's other temples, the Veracruz Mexico Temple was closed due to the COVID-19 pandemic.

See also

 Comparison of temples of The Church of Jesus Christ of Latter-day Saints
 List of temples of The Church of Jesus Christ of Latter-day Saints
 List of temples of The Church of Jesus Christ of Latter-day Saints by geographic region
 Temple architecture (Latter-day Saints)
 The Church of Jesus Christ of Latter-day Saints in Mexico

References

Additional reading

External links
Veracruz Mexico Temple Official site
Veracruz Mexico Temple at ChurchofJesusChristTemples.org

20th-century Latter Day Saint temples
Buildings and structures in Veracruz
Temples (LDS Church) completed in 2000
Temples (LDS Church) in Mexico
2000 establishments in Mexico